The Vermont Catamounts represented the University of Vermont in Women's Hockey East Association play during the 2014–15 NCAA Division I women's ice hockey season.

Offseason
August 4: Amanda Pelkey was invited to participate at the 2014 USA Hockey Women's National Festival in Lake Placid, New York.
August 18: Amanda Pelkey (USA) and Gina Repaci (Canada) were chosen by their respective U22 National Teams for the Canada/US Series in Calgary, Alberta

Recruiting

Roster

2014–15 Catamounts

Schedule

|-
!colspan=12 style=""| Regular Season

|-
!colspan=12 style=""| WHEA Tournament

Awards and honors

Dayna Colang named Honorable Mention WHEA All-Star.

Miscellaneous
Amanda Pelkey signed with the Boston Pride of the NWHL

References

Vermont